Ivy King was the largest pure-fission nuclear bomb ever tested by the United States. The bomb was tested during the Truman administration as part of Operation Ivy. This series of tests involved the development of very powerful nuclear weapons in response to the nuclear weapons program of the Soviet Union.

The production of Ivy King was hurried to be ready in case its sister project, Ivy Mike, failed in its attempt to achieve a thermonuclear reaction. The Ivy King test actually took place two weeks after the Mike test. Unlike the Mike bomb, the Ivy King device could theoretically have been added to United States' nuclear arsenal, because it was designed to be air-deliverable.

The Ivy King bomb, designated as a Mk-18 bomb and named the "Super Oralloy Bomb", was a modified version of the Mk-6D bomb. Instead of using an implosion system similar to the Mk-6D, it used a 92-point implosion system initially developed for the Mk-13. Its uranium-plutonium core was replaced by 60 kg of highly enriched uranium (HEU) fashioned into a thin-walled sphere equivalent to approximately four critical masses. The thin-walled sphere was a commonly used design, which ensured that the fissile material remained sub-critical until imploded. The HEU sphere was then enclosed in a natural-uranium tamper. To physically prevent the HEU sphere collapsing into a critical condition if the surrounding explosives were detonated accidentally, or if the sphere was crushed following an aircraft accident, the hollow center was filled with a chain made from aluminum and boron, which was pulled out to arm the bomb. The boron-coated chain also absorbed the neutrons needed to drive the nuclear reaction.

The primary designer of the Super Oralloy Bomb, physicist Ted Taylor, later became a vocal proponent of nuclear disarmament.

With an explosive force of 500-kilotons, Ivy King is the second largest known fission-only device ever tested after the Orange Herald nuclear device, a 720-kiloton atomic bomb tested by the United Kingdom on 31 May 1957, which remains to date the largest fission device ever tested.

Gallery

References

Chuck Hansen (1995) Swords of Armageddon. Published on CD-Rom only by Chukelea, Sunnyvale, CA.

External links

Operation Ivy
Video of the Ivy King Nuclear Test

Explosions in 1952
Enewetak Atoll nuclear explosive tests
1952 in the United States
Articles containing video clips
November 1952 events in the United States